Madison Local School District is the name of multiple public school districts in the U.S. state of Ohio:

Madison Local School District (Butler County)
Madison Local School District (Lake County)
Madison Local School District (Richland County)